"Henry Please Come Home" was the ninth episode of the first season of the TV series M*A*S*H. It originally aired on November 19, 1972. It was written by Laurence Marks and was directed by William Wiard.

Guest cast is Odessa Cleveland as Ginger, Patrick Adiarte as Ho-Jon, Timothy Brown as Spearchucker Jones, John Orchard as Capt. 'Ugly John' Black, Bob Gooden as Boone, Bill Svanoe as Aide, Noel Tey as Mama San, Jean Fleet as Nurse, Kasuko Sakuro as Cho-Cho, and G. Wood as Brigadier Gen. Hamilton Hammond.  Though the character of Gen. Hammond would continue to be mentioned in a few subsequent episodes, this episode features Hammond's final appearance on the show.

Overview
Henry receives a citation for the camp achieving the best efficiency rating of any M*A*S*H unit, and then Brigadier General Hammond reassigns him to Tokyo. Frank then changes the camp to be more military, and he confiscates Hawkeye's and Trapper's still. They use forged passes to go to Tokyo to convince Henry to come back and end up pretending Radar is sick. Their ruse is revealed but Henry decides to return anyway.

Notes

External links
 

M*A*S*H (season 1) episodes
1972 American television episodes
Television episodes directed by William Wiard